The Polish Academy Award for Best Editing is an annual award given to the best Polish film editing of the year.

Winners and nominees

References

External links
 Polish Film Awards; Official website 

Film editing awards
Polish film awards
Awards established in 1999
1999 establishments in Poland